Frank Buglioni (born 18 April 1989) is a British former professional boxer who competed from 2011 to 2018. He challenged once for the WBA super-middleweight title in 2015. At regional level, he held the British light-heavyweight title from 2016 to 2018, and challenged once for the Commonwealth light-heavyweight title in 2018.

Amateur career
Buglioni took up boxing at the age of 14 to increase his fitness and strength, his priority at the time being football. Buglioni joined the Waltham Forest Amateur Boxing Club, and after winning his first four fights it was decided that he would move on to train at the Repton Boxing Club in Bethnal Green under the tutelage of head coach Tony Burns.

Buglioni went on to have 70 amateur fights, winning 60 and losing 10, with over half of his wins by knockout. He won two national titles and also picked up various medals, whilst representing his country in international tournaments, including a silver medal against the world number one Vijender Singh in the Commonwealth Federations Tournament in Delhi in 2010.

Buglioni was selected to train with the Great Britain Olympic team in 2010. However, the following year he decided to turn professional.

Professional career
Nicknamed "The Wise Guy", Buglioni made his professional debut in November 2011, stopping Sabie Montieth in the first round. He won his first 10 fights before stopping Stepan Horvath in the eighth round in November 2013 to win the WBO European super middleweight title. He successfully defended the title three months later against Gaetano Nespro, but lost it in April 2014 when he was stopped by Sergey Khomitsky.

Three months later he stopped Sam Couzens in four rounds to win the vacant BBBofC Southern Area super middleweight title. In November he regained the WBO European title with a unanimous decision over the previously unbeaten Andrew Robinson. He made two further defences (a first round stoppage of Ivan Jukic and a draw with Lee Markham) before beating Fernando Castaneda in July 2015 to take the vacant WBA International super middleweight title.

In September 2015 he challenged for Fedor Chudinov's WBA World super middleweight title at Wembley Arena; The fight went the full 12 rounds with Chudinov winning comfortably on points.

In 2016, Buglioni moved up to light heavyweight, stopping journeyman Olegs Fedotovs in the first round in March.

On 10 December 2016, on the undercard of Anthony Joshua vs. Éric Molina, Buglioni fought Hosea Burton in a tightly contested 12 round affair. With Buglioni down on the scorecards going into the 12th he produced a stunning knockout to get the win catapulting himself forwards in the rankings. It was one of the fights of 2016.

Buglioni was trained by Mark Tibbs at the TRAD TKO Boxing Gym in Canning Town, before moving on to work with the Irish boxing brothers Paschal Collins and former world champion Steve Collins at the Celtic Warrior Boxing Gym in Dublin, Ireland. In 2016, he moved on to new trainer Don Charles.

In his first defence of the British light heavyweight title, Buglioni faced Ricky Summers. Summers held his own, but in the end Buglioni was too much for Summers and won the contest on points.

In his next fight, Buglioni was slated to battle undefeated Callum Johnson. Johnson, however, dropped shortly before the fight. He was replaced by another undefeated Brit, Craig Richards. Buglioni managed to secure the win via unanimous decision.

On 24 March 2018, Buglioni and Callum Johnson finally squared of in the ring, in a bid for both the British and the Commonwealth light heavyweight titles. Johnson knocked Buglioni down and managed to finish him via TKO in the first round.

On 24 November 2018, Frank fought Fanlong Meng from China, who was undefeated and was ranked #11 by the IBF. In the early rounds, Buglioni was struggling to connect on the savvy defensive Meng. As the action went on, Buglioni suffered a cut above his right eye and the doctor called for a break to take a look at the cut. The fight was initially resumed, however, the cut grew only worse, and the doctor was forced to stop the fight with 1:58 to go in the fifth round.

Two days after the fight, Buglioni announced that at the age of 29, he is officially retiring from boxing. "After thoughtful deliberation; I have decided to hang up the gloves. I am proud of all my achievements in boxing and I will be forever grateful of the life lessons and positive effects it has given me." - said Buglioni as a part of his official statement.

Personal life 
Buglioni has Italian heritage and can trace his roots to Naples. His great grandfather emigrated to London in the 1920s. He was born and raised in Enfield, London where he still resides between training camps.

After achieving his International Baccalaureate Diploma from Highlands School, Buglioni attended the University of Westminster to study building surveying. He chose to put his education on hold when he was selected for the GB Olympic team. Buglioni has said he would like to go back and complete his degree.

Buglioni's boxing heroes are Oscar De La Hoya and Arturo "Thunder" Gatti.

Before Buglioni took up boxing full-time, he worked as a building surveyor. He supports London football team Chelsea F.C.

Professional boxing record

References

External links
 

Frank Buglioni - Profile, News Archive & Current Rankings at Box.Live

1989 births
Living people
English male boxers
Super-middleweight boxers
Italian British sportspeople
British people of Italian descent
English people of Italian descent